Sligo Mac Diarmada station, also known as Sligo railway station, is a mainline railway station which serves the town of Sligo in County Sligo, Ireland. It is a terminal station which now has two platforms and an intermediate carriage siding.  The railway at the station is elevated above the surrounding streets and the station building dominates its surrounds.  There is a passing loop at the approach to the station. It is named after Irish patriot Seán Mac Diarmada. Iarnród Éireann, Ireland's national railway operator, runs inter-city rail services between Sligo and Dublin on the Dublin-Sligo railway line.

History
The station opened on 3 December 1862, when Sligo acquired rail links to Dublin.  The Sligo, Leitrim and Northern Counties Railway linked to Enniskillen to the north in 1881.  A link to Limerick and the south followed in 1895. The line to Enniskillen closed in 1957 and passenger services to Limerick closed in 1963.

The station building was burned down and destroyed on 11 January 1923 during the Irish Civil War.  Seven engines were sent down the line to the quay and one crashed through a concrete wall into the harbour.

The station formerly had two intermediate carriage sidings rather than one.  The southern platform was previously shorter and included a small bay platform.  There was a depot previously to the south of the line to the east of the station, the building is now demolished.  The turntable was used for turning steam locomotives and later proved useful for turning 121 Class single cabbed diesel locomotives.

Naming
In 1966, Sligo railway station was renamed Mac Diarmada Station after Irish rebel Seán Mac Diarmada from County Leitrim.

Freight terminal
There is a line to the mothballed freight terminal which curves off to the north and downward just before the station.  The facility includes a large crane for handling containers.

Connections
Sligo bus station is at street level adjacent to south side of the station.

Gallery

See also
 List of railway stations in Ireland

References

External links

Irish Rail Sligo station website

Iarnród Éireann stations in County Sligo
Railway stations in County Sligo
Railway stations opened in 1862
Sligo (town)
1862 establishments in Ireland
Railway stations in the Republic of Ireland opened in the 19th century